Candice Richer (born 28 November 2000) is a French Polynesian athlete specialising in the high jump and triple jump. She has represented French Polynesia at the Pacific Games and Polynesian Championships in Athletics.

Richer began athletics training in 2014.

At the 2019 Pacific Games in Apia she won bronze in the high jump and triple jump.

References

Living people
2000 births
French Polynesian athletes